Helga is a feminine given name.

Helga may also refer to:

 Helga (call), a running gag at German concerts and festivals
 Helga – Vom Werden des menschlichen Lebens, a 1967 West German film
 Helga (crater), a crater on Venus
 522 Helga, a minor planet orbiting the Sun
 HMY Helga, later the Irish patrol vessel Muirchú, a Royal Navy ship active during the Easter Rising of 1916
 SS Helga, a Danish cargo ship in service 1933-38
 Hurricane Helga, a 1966 Pacific hurricane
 Tropical Storm Helga, a 1970 Pacific tropical storm
 Tropical Storm Helga, a 1974 Pacific tropical storm